Lawrence (or Laurence) Friedman (or Freedman or Freeman) may refer to:
 Harry Lawrence Freeman (1869–1954), American composer and conductor
 Bud Freeman (1906–1991), American jazz musician 
 Lawrence M. Friedman (born 1930), American law professor
 Sir Lawrence Freedman (born 1948), British professor of war studies, diplomacy, and international relations
 Laurence Freeman (born 1951), British Benedictine monk and priest
 Lawrence G. Friedman, author of the book that defines the go to market plan